= Katumsky sheep =

Breed of sheep

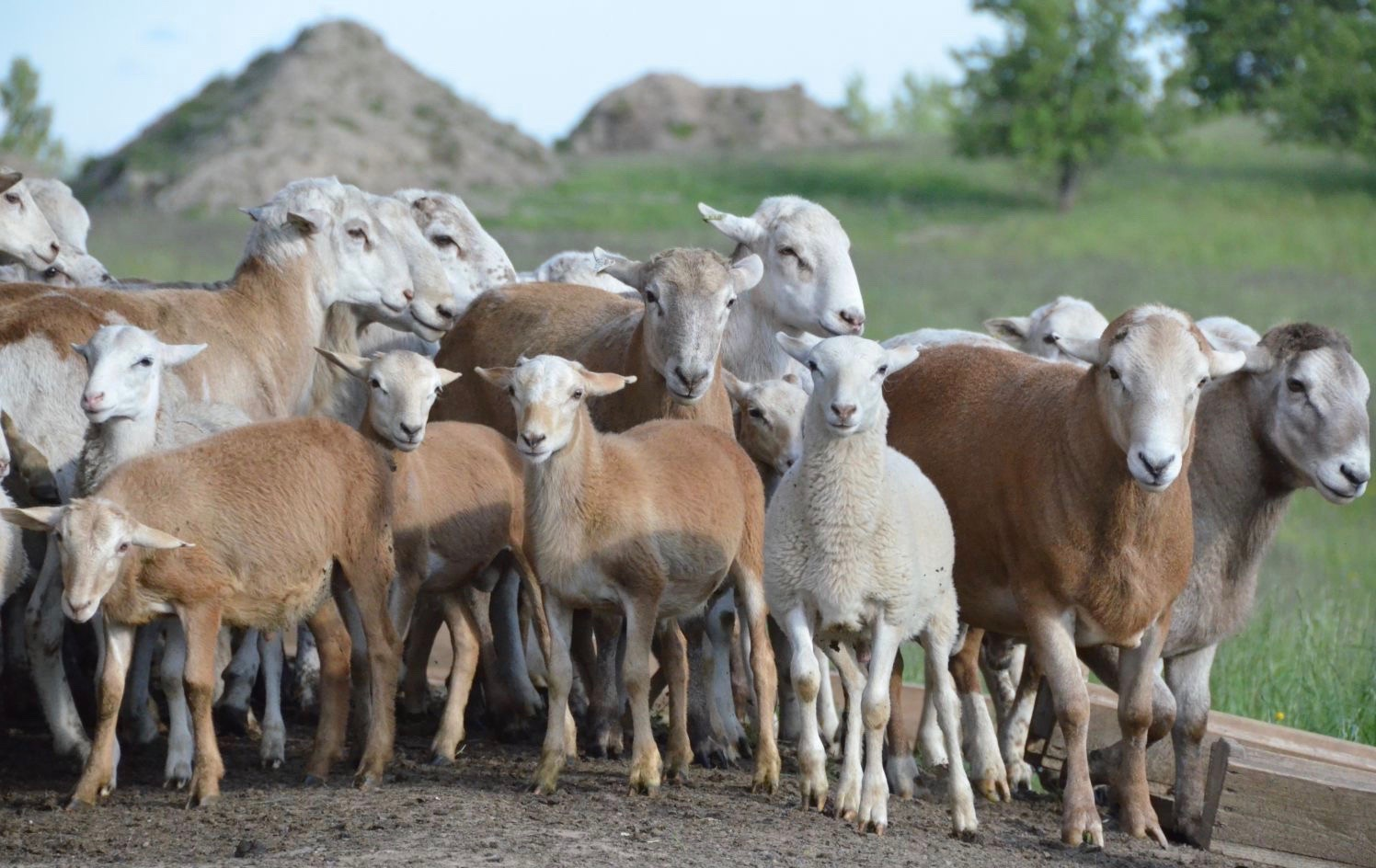
- Катумская овца
- Other names: Катумская овца
- Country of origin: Russia
- Use: Meat

Traits
- Weight: Male: 110 kg (240 lb); Female: 80 kg (180 lb)
- Horn status: Rams and the ewes are polled (hornless)

Notes
- Adapted to live in cold climates

Katumsky sheep are a Russian sheep breed.

== History ==
Katumsky sheep were developed around 2013 at Katumy Farm near Vsevolozhsky district of Leningrad oblast, Russia by Oleg Lebed, primarily for meat production. Due to its ability to adapt to a variety of regions within Russia, the Katumsky sheep breed has the potential to become the basis of a commercially and economically engaging herd due to their ability immunological reactivity, high fertility, maternal qualities and low maintenance costs.

== Characteristics ==
Katumsky are easy to care for. They are calm, plain bodied sheep that produce little wool. They are of medium height with a strong skeleton, well-developed muscles, wide and deep chests, a middle tail and hornless head. At maturity on average, rams weigh 110 kg (242 lb) and ewes, on average, weigh 80 kg (176 lb) under good conditions. High lambing percentages are common (up to 220 per 100 ewes).

The breed is quite common in the north-west areas of Russia.
